Middle Fork Cimarron River is a  tributary of the Cimarron River in Colorado. The river's source is east of Coxcomb Peak in the Uncompahgre Wilderness of Hinsdale County.  It joins the East Fork Cimarron River in Gunnison County to form the Cimarron River, and is impounded by Silver Jack Dam.

See also
List of rivers of Colorado
List of tributaries of the Colorado River

References

Rivers of Colorado
Rivers of Gunnison County, Colorado
Rivers of Hinsdale County, Colorado
Tributaries of the Colorado River in Colorado